Nicholas Retzlaff (born September 3, 1996) is an American professional soccer player.

Career

Youth and college
Retzlaff played college soccer for North Carolina State University. He was redshirted during three years of his time with the Wolfpack.

Retzlaff played in USL League Two, for three seasons, then known as the Premier Development League. During the 2015 season, he spent time with Carolina Dynamo. During the 2017 and 2018 seasons, he played with North Carolina FC U23.

Professional
On January 18, 2019, Retzlaff signed a one-year contract with the Richmond Kickers.

References

External links
 
 Nick Retzlaff at NC State Athletics

1996 births
Living people
American soccer players
Association football midfielders
North Carolina Fusion U23 players
NC State Wolfpack men's soccer players
North Carolina FC U23 players
People from Wake Forest, North Carolina
Richmond Kickers players
Soccer players from North Carolina
USL League One players
USL League Two players